Stephen Thomas Nash  (born 1942) is a British diplomat. He was Chargé d'Affaires to Albania from 1993 to 1995, Ambassador to Georgia from 1995 to 1998, Ambassador to Albania from 1998 to 1999, and Ambassador to Latvia from 1999 to 2002.

References

Ambassadors of the United Kingdom to Albania
Ambassadors of the United Kingdom to Georgia (country)
Ambassadors of the United Kingdom to Latvia
1942 births
Living people